The 1956 Taunton by-election was held on 14 February 1956.  It was held due to the elevation to a hereditary peerage of the Conservative MP, Henry Hopkinson.  The seat was retained by the Conservative candidate Edward du Cann, albeit with a narrow majority of 657 votes.

References

Taunton by-election
Taunton by-election
Taunton by-election
By-election, 1956
By-elections to the Parliament of the United Kingdom in Somerset constituencies
20th century in Somerset